The 2021 Nottingham Trophy was a professional tennis tournament played on outdoor grass courts. It was the seventh edition of the tournament which was part of the 2021 ATP Challenger Tour and the 2021 ITF Women's World Tennis Tour. It took place in Nottingham, United Kingdom between 14 and 20 June 2021.

ATP singles main-draw entrants

Seeds

 1 Rankings are as of 31 May 2021.

Other entrants
The following players received wildcards into the main draw:
  Jay Clarke
  Anton Matusevich
  Aidan McHugh

The following player received entry into the singles main draw using a protected ranking:
  Tomáš Macháč

The following players received entry into the singles main draw as alternates:
  Thomas Fabbiano
  Leonardo Mayer
  Go Soeda

The following players received entry from the qualifying draw:
  Alex Bolt
  Marius Copil
  Ernesto Escobedo
  Ramkumar Ramanathan

The following player received entry as a lucky loser:
  Zhang Zhizhen

Women's singles main-draw entrants

Seeds

 1 Rankings are as of 31 May 2021.

Other entrants
The following players received wildcards into the singles main draw:
  Jodie Burrage
  Samantha Murray Sharan
  Matilda Mutavdzic
  Emma Raducanu

The following players received entry from the qualifying draw:
  Cristina Bucșa
  Mayo Hibi
  Monica Niculescu
  Arina Rodionova
  Storm Sanders
  Daria Snigur

Champions

Men's singles

 Alex Bolt def.  Kamil Majchrzak 4–6, 6–4, 6–3.

Women's singles

  Alison Van Uytvanck def.  Arina Rodionova 6–0, 6–4.

Men's doubles

  Marc Polmans /  Matt Reid def.  Benjamin Bonzi /  Antoine Hoang 6–4, 4–6, [10–8].

Women's doubles

  Monica Niculescu /  Elena-Gabriela Ruse def.  Priscilla Hon /  Storm Sanders 7–5, 7–5

References

External links
 2021 Nottingham Trophy at ITFtennis.com
 Official website

2021 ATP Challenger Tour
2021 ITF Women's World Tennis Tour
2021 in British sport
June 2021 sports events in the United Kingdom